Der Österreichische Volkswirt (also known as ÖVW; German: The Austrian Economist) was an economics and political magazine published between 1908 and 1998 with an interruption from 1939 to 1945 in Vienna, Austria. It was the first business publication in the country. The subtitle of the magazine was Zeitschrift für Industrie und Finanzwesen (German: Industry and Finance Journal).

History and profile
ÖVW was started in Vienna in September 1908. The founder of the magazine was Walther Federn. The magazine was published by Volkswirtschaftl. Verlag on a biweekly basis.

Karl Polanyi contributed to the magazine in the mid-1920s. He was also on the editorial team from 1924 to 1938. Polanyi was forced to leave the publication due to the start of Anschluss. Peter F. Drucker was another contributor of the magazine.

ÖVW ceased publication in 1938 after the publication of the issue 31. The magazine was restarted as a weekly magazine in December 1945. It was permanently closed in August 1998 following the publication of the issue 84.

See also
List of magazines in Austria

References

External links
 Digitized issues of Der Österreichische Volkswirt (National Library of Austria) 

1908 establishments in Austria
1998 disestablishments in Austria
Biweekly magazines
Business magazines
Defunct magazines published in Austria
Defunct political magazines
German-language magazines
Magazines established in 1908
Magazines disestablished in 1998
Magazines published in Vienna
Weekly magazines published in Austria